The University of Buraimi (UOB) is a private university in the Al Buraimi Governorate in the Northern part of Oman. The university opened on 6 November 2010. The university is a product of a European-Omani consortium, and offers programs under Omani and European control.

References

External links
 Official website of the University of Buraimi
University of Buraimi

Universities in Oman
Educational institutions established in 2010
2010 establishments in Oman